(March 26, 1908  - July 7, 1957) was one of the most prominent Japanese photographers in the first half of the 20th century.

He was born in Osaka and became a member of the Naniwa Photography Club in 1928.

In 1933 he published the monograph Shoka Shinkei (初夏神経, "Early Summer Nerves"), one of the most important works for Japanese modernist photography (Shinkō Shashin, 新興写真).  In this work, he used many photographic techniques such as photomontage and photograms and succeeded in creating surrealistic images.

Although Koishi's unconventional style reached a large audience through Shoka Shinkei, it was not without criticisms. Notably, the reception of his monograph was markedly different in Tokyo. They were criticized as being "abstract, self-righteous, and lacking in reality". At the time the Tokyo photography scene was fixated on a more journalistic documentary style of photography with a focus on social issues.

From 1938, he worked for the Japanese government in the magazine Shashin Shūhō (写真週報, "Photo Weekly"). And he became a war photographer of the  Second Sino-Japanese War. Therefore, he was no longer able to produce avant-garde photo.

After World War II, he continued to take many photographs. However, he could not leave the works from the effects of restricted activity due to the war. In 1957, Koishi died by accident fall on the station platform in Moji, Fukuoka Prefecture (present Moji-ku, Kitakyushu) .

Exhibition in Japan 
Kiyoshi Koishi and Naniwa Shashin Club (小石清と浪華写真倶楽部展) at Hyogo Prefectural Museum of Modern Art (兵庫県立近代美術館) and Seibu Contemporary Art Gallery (西武百貨店コンテンポラリーアートギャラリー), 1988

References and further reading 
Kaneko Ryūichi. Modern Photography in Japan 1915-1940. San Francisco: Friends of Photography, 2001. 
 Koishi Kiyoshi. Shoka Shinkei (初夏神経, Early Summer Nerves, 1933. Republished by Kokushokankōkai in 2005 with short English commentary. 
 Exhibition Catalogue for "Kiyoshi Koishi and Naniwa Shashin Club" (Hyogo Prefectural Museum of Modern Art and Seibu Contemporary Art Gallery, 1988) (no ISBN)
 Koishi Kiyoshi to zen'ei shashin (小石清と前衛写真, "Kiyoshi Koishi and avant-garde photography"). Nihon no Shashinka (日本の写真家), vol. 15. Tokyo: Iwanami, 1999. 
Tucker, Anne Wilkes, et al. The History of Japanese Photography. New Haven: Yale University Press, 2003.

See also 
photography
List of photographers

References 

1908 births
1957 deaths
Japanese photographers
People from Osaka
Accidental deaths in Japan